John Victor Monckton (13 October 1955 – 29 November 2004) was a financier who was killed in his own house in November 2004, by Elliott White and Damien Hanson, while the latter was on probation after serving half of his 12-year sentence for attempted murder.

Biography
Educated at Downside and Lincoln College, Oxford, he rose to the position of Managing Director of Bonds at Legal & General Group PLC, a large British insurance firm. He was a Roman Catholic, and a distant cousin of Viscount Monckton of Brenchley. He joined the Sovereign Military Order of Malta in 1977.

He was murdered and his wife severely assaulted at their home in Upper Cheyne Row in the Royal Borough of Kensington and Chelsea, nominally a low-crime area. His nine-year-old daughter called the police, but the killers fled the scene. A suspect, Damien Hanson, was arrested the following day.

Murder
Hanson was eventually convicted of Monckton's murder and sentenced to serve three life sentences for killing Monckton, and the attempted murder of Monckton's wife Homeyra, in November 2004. His accomplice, Elliot White, is serving 18 years for manslaughter, wounding with intent and robbery.

The trial judge recommended that Hanson should serve a minimum of 36 years before being considered for parole. This is one of the lengthiest minimum terms ever handed out in British legal history, and is expected to keep Hanson behind bars until at least 2041 and the age of 61.

Hanson had at least one previous conviction for attempted murder, for which he received a 12-year sentence, when he killed Monckton. Hanson had been released from jail three months before the killing, halfway through his sentence. In 2006, Hanson's half sister, Laura Campbell,  was jailed for four years for providing a fake alibi for the crime.

References

External links
BBC News Robber jailed for banker murder
BBC News story on his murder
BBC News story on arrest of suspect
More details for the killing of John Monckton
BBC News story of conviction of murderer

2004 murders in the United Kingdom
2004 in London
2000s murders in London
Deaths by person in London
Murder in London
21st century in the Royal Borough of Kensington and Chelsea
November 2004 events in the United Kingdom